Galatians 3:28 is the twenty-eighth verse of the third chapter in the Epistle to the Galatians in the New Testament of the Christian Bible. It is a widely commented biblical passage among Paul's statements. It is sometimes cited in various Christian discussions about gender equality and racism.

Content
In the King James Version of the Bible the text reads:
There is neither Jew nor Greek, there is neither bond nor free, there is neither male nor female: for ye are all one in Christ Jesus.

In the Berean Study Bible the text reads:
There is neither Jew nor Greek, slave nor free, male nor female, for you are all one in Christ Jesus. 

The original Greek, according to Westcott-Hort, Byzantine Majority and Textus Receptus, is:

For a collection of other versions see BibleHub Galatians 3:28.

Analysis
This is literally translated "There is neither Jew nor Greek, slave nor free, male nor female, for you are all one in Christ Jesus". It is disputed to what extent the verse actually means to negate all differences between Jews and Greeks, women and men, and so forth. One interpretation is that conventional translations are misleading, because really the verse intends to say that all have the opportunity to become Christians, but not that social differences should be eradicated. It is also debated if the word literally translated "Greek" refers to Greeks or to all non-Jews; it is sometimes translated "gentile".

Connection with other biblical passages
The conventional interpretation is that the passage is part of a baptismal invocation. However, there are other minority views, one of which connects the verse to the circumcision controversy in early Christianity. New Testament scholar Bernard  C.  Lategan argued that a pre-Pauline origin was unlikely due to the novel and unique character of the verse. There is also a theory which links the verse to Genesis  1:27, which states that man was created in the image of God. There is also an argument that Galatians 3:28 negates Genesis 2:24, which prescribes gender differences.

There are strong parallels between Galatians 3:28 and Colossians 3:11 ("Here there is no Gentile or Jew, circumcised or uncircumcised, barbarian, Scythian, slave or free, but Christ is all, and is in all.") and 1 Corinthians 12:13 ("For we were all baptized by one Spirit so as to form one body—whether Jews or Gentiles, slave or free—and we were all given the one Spirit to drink."). Bruce Hansen calls this "arguably the most prominent refrain in the Pauline corpus". Its influence has also been seen in Romans 3:9 and 10:12; 1 Corinthians 1:22–24, 7:18–22 and 10:32; and Ephesians 6:8.

Specific issues

Gender equality

Some believe that this verse, along with the New Testament household codes, is key to understanding debates about the role of women in Christianity. While some holding to biblical patriarchy or complementarianism argue that this verse appears within a context of justification and redemption, Christian egalitarians argue that the verse supports equal role for men and women in Christianity and secular life. The verse has also been analyzed in queer theology. At the time, the verse could be considered a seditious attack on the Roman institution of patriarchal marriage.

Slavery
The verse is used to argue for Christian abolitionism, the idea that Christianity considers slavery an evil and wants an end to it. New Testament  scholar Darius Jankiewicz considers the verse the "Magna Carta of the abolitionists' movement". Abolitionists argued that the verse planted the seeds for future abolition of slavery, because accepting the spiritual equality of all believers made slavery inconceivable; black Christians also adopted this interpretation. Pro-slavery Christians disagreed, pointing to other passages in the Bible in which Paul commands slaves to obey their masters (Ephesians 6:5–9).

The passage was omitted from the slave bible because of fear that it could incite rebellion.

Racism
In 1957, Martin Luther King Jr. cited the passage in a pamphlet oppositing racial segregation in the United States. He wrote, "Racial segregation is a blatant denial of the unity which we all have in Christ." He also alluded to the verse at the end of his "I Have a Dream" speech.

As a whole
Considered in its entirety, the verse is cited to support an egalitarian interpretation of Christianity.

According to Jakobus M. Vorster, the central question debated by theologians "is whether the statement in Galatians  3:28 about ecclesiastical relationships can be translated into a Christian-ethical norm for all human relationships". Vorster argues that it can, and that the verse provides a Christian foundation for the promotion of human rights and equality, in contrast to "patriarchy, racism and exploitation" which in his opinion are caused by human sinfulness.

According to Karin Neutel, "Contemporary interpreters have updated Paul’s statement and added pairs to the three original ones: 'neither gay nor straight,' 'neither healthy nor disabled,' and 'neither black nor white.'... [The original] three pairs must have been as relevant in the first century, as the additional categories are today." She argues that the verse points to a utopian, cosmopolitan community.

References

General sources
 
 
 
 
 
 
 
 
 
 
 
 
 
 
 
 

Epistle to the Galatians
Christianity and women
Christianity and slavery
New Testament verses